Gerald William Connolly (born 15 November 1957) is an Australian comedian, actor, impressionist and pianist. He is best known for his satirical caricatures of public figures such as Queen Elizabeth II, Prince Charles, Margaret Thatcher, Ronald Reagan, Joh Bjelke-Petersen, Neville Wran, Malcolm Fraser, Bob Hawke, Paul Keating, John Howard, Bill Collins and Dame Joan Sutherland, amongst many others.

Career

Comedy
He has gained much notoriety in Australia and the UK, having much success at the Melbourne Comedy Festival and Adelaide Comedy Festival with his hit one-man shows, including Gerry Connolly - Alone Or With Others and ICONNOLLY. In 1986, his live performances earned him the Wallace "Comedian Of The Year" Award. He has also made many TV appearances, including spots on Fast Forward, Live and Sweaty, Tonight Live with Steve Vizard, Hey Hey Its Saturday and Kath & Kim, as well as his own series, The Gerry Connolly Show.

Television
Connolly played the Headmaster in ABC1's Dead Gorgeous.

Connolly appeared as himself in the ninth episode of the 1998 Australia television series The Games (in which he impersonated Bob Hawke).

In 2019, Connolly auditioned for Britain's Got Talent impersonating Queen Elizabeth II while roasting the judges. 
He was eliminated in the 2nd semi-final.

Film
In 1993, Connolly featured in a dramatic role portraying former Queensland premier  Joh Bjelke-Petersen in the ABC TV telemovie Joh's Jury. He also had the major role of "Lou Rickets" in the Australian family film The Real Macaw in 1998, and made a cameo appearance as "Father Murphy" in The Wog Boy.

Theatre
Connolly has also had a successful career in the theatre, working with such groups as the Melbourne Theatre Company, Sydney Theatre Company and Belvoir St Theatre. He played the role of "Mahoney" in the Melbourne Theatre Company's 1999 production of Arturo Ui, which earned him a nomination for a Green Room Award for Best Supporting Actor. In 2022 he played the role of Mr Paravicini in the Australian tour of The Mousetrap.

Music
He graduated from the Queensland Conservatorium of Music with a Bachelor of Music, and has played piano with the Melbourne, Queensland and Tasmania Symphony Orchestras, being featured in concerts televised across Australia and the UK.

Awards

Mo Awards
The Australian Entertainment Mo Awards (commonly known informally as the Mo Awards), were annual Australian entertainment industry awards. They recognise achievements in live entertainment in Australia from 1975 to 2016.
 (wins only)
|-
| 2004
| Gerry Connolly
| Male Comedy Performer of the Year 
| 
|-

References

External links
http://www.icmi.com.au/gerry-connolly

http://www.celebrityspeakers.com.au/brspeaker_bio.asp?Speaker_Index_Text=51

1957 births
Living people
Australian male comedians
Australian impressionists (entertainers)
Queensland Conservatorium Griffith University alumni
Britain's Got Talent contestants